Marabut, officially the Municipality of Marabut, is a 5th class municipality in the province of Samar, Philippines. According to the 2020 census, it has a population of 17,842 people.

Its coast stretches more than  along the San Pedro Bay and Leyte Gulf.

History
The municipality of Marabut came into existence not by mere happenstance but thru the combined efforts and inimitable enthusiasm of same courageous and visionary leaders who dared to create an idyllic haven out of virtual wilderness. Long before the construction of Mabaysay Church ( Basey Church) in the year 1846 A.D, there were already people who inhabited this place, who only commonly known as Umhanan or Tinawgan. The family of AGUSTIN GREFIEL, LOGERO FERRERAS and CATATO AMANTILLO were among the first inhabitants. These people intermarried. Afraid for the guardia Civil Forcibly taking them to work for the construction for the church of Mabaysay (former name of Basey) they settled in the hinterlands.

In 1868 before the birth of Dr. Jose Rizal, some settler of this place transferred their residence to the shoreline until the Balangiga Massacre happened on September 28, 1901. Some settlers from Balangiga transferred to the inhabitants community for they were afraid that the American forces might retaliate against them. The Population of this place increased in number and there came a man named SINGOY AMANTILLO, blessed with five children, namely BICARIO, MAURICIO ENRIQUE or “ IKING”, JACOBO alias “KA BUTA” and one known as LAMI. Then the family of a known man YSIDRO MISTA FERERAS came and settled here too. During the Spanish regime until late before the establishment of the commonwealth Republic, YSIDRO encouraged ENGRACIO AMANTILLO and MAURICIO AMANTILLO to change the name Umhanan to tinawgan to sitio Lipata, because of its numerous Lipata trees growing around and later on because of its recognition, As the gradual transition of time, leaping incidents continued its way for another generation of men. There came another famous man, BICARIO AMNATILLO, the famous fierce and brave soldier who was widely known throughout the Province of Samar as a revolutionary leader during the Filipino-American Revolution. He organized the resident of sitio Lipata for mutual defense against the Muslim bandits and other enemies. He worked also for the improvements of the sitio until the time of his capture. His right-hand man. YSIDRO M. FERRERAS, the contemporary revolutionary leaderalso fierce, diplomatic and gallant magistrate, succeeded him. He successfully worked for the improvement of this sitio for the welfare of this fellowmen. After the defeat of the Filipino by the American soldiers during the revolutionary era, civil government of the Philippine started as well as the American regime. The growth of the population in sitio Lipata has rapidly increased where in prominent figures came under the leadership of YSIDRO. They decided to settle in a barrio called Hilaba instead of sitio Lipata due to its considerable wider level of land area and hill in the middle where it was available for a church to be constructed. However, majority of the residents of sitio Lipata retracted the proposal on the ground that it was more difficult especially for bancas to reach the ashore at low tide. Finally Ysidro decided to convert sitio Lipata into the barrio Sto Niño of Basey Samar. Ysidro was elected as Mayor of basey, while Engracio was elected as Municipal Vice-Mayor and likewise, Mauricio was elected as the Cabeza del Barrio Sto. Niño. When the world war 11 broke out on December 7, 1941, the elementary Education in Barrio Sto. Niño was temporarily closed until the war ended in the year 1944. Early in 1949, the same mayor showed his never ending spirit of leadership when he submitted a proposal to President Elpidio Quirino for the conversion of Barrio Sto. Niño into a Municipality. On July 22, 1949, through the help of the late speaker of the house of Representative, Hon. Lorenzo Perez, Executive Order No. 247 was issued and signed by the President Creating the Municipality of Marabut, Samar in Honor of the late Cogressman SERAFIN MARABUT, a native of Basey, Samar. Ysidro M. Ferreras was elected as the first Municipal Mayor and Engracio Amantillo as the vice Mayor. Municipality of Marabut is composed of 14 barangays. Namely; San Roque, Tag-Alag, Legaspi, Caluayan, Tinabanan, Osmena, Canyoyo, Binocyahan, Odoc, Pinana-an, Sto. Nino (Pobl), Lipata, Amambucale, and Pinamitinan. A year later during the time of late mayor Macario Ferreras, through Municipal Ordinance, Poblacion Marabut was divided into four barangays. Amantillo, Sto. Nino, Catato, and Lipata. Brgy. Pinamitinan was divided into three barangays, Sta. Rita and Malobago, Brgy. Odoc was divided into two barangays, the brgy. Ferreras, Brgy. Binocyahan was divided into two barangays, brgy. Logero. Osmenia was divided into four, brgy. Mabuhay, Rono, and Panan-awan. Legaspi was divided into two, brgy. Veloso. Now Marabut has 24 barangays after all. The first barangay captain of brgy. Amantillo was Amado A. Opena. Henceforth, Brgy. Amantillo, Marabut has produced sons and daughters who are committed to hold the dreams of their forefather and turn them into magnificent realties.

Geography

Barangays
Marabut is politically subdivided into 24 barangays. In 1957, the sitio of Pinana-an was converted into barrio Pinalangga.

Climate

Demographics

Economy

References

External links

 Marabut Profile at PhilAtlas.com
 [ Philippine Standard Geographic Code]
 Philippine Census Information
 Local Governance Performance Management System
 Official Website of Marabut Samar

Municipalities of Samar (province)
Establishments by Philippine executive order